Viviane Marcelle Joan Robinson  is an emeritus distinguished professor at the University of Auckland, specialising in organisational and educational psychology.

Academic career 

After a PhD titled The behavior of caregivers: the example of clinical teams at Harvard University, completed in 1976, Robinson moved to the University of Auckland. She was appointed a Distinguished Professor in 2012.

Robinson has published extensively on school improvement and leadership. She worked to reduce the gap between research and practice in education, believing that the gap often resulted from the methodology chosen by researchers. Her book "Reduce Change to Increase Improvement" was designed to encourage educational leaders to stop thinking that innovation and change would always lead to improvement in educational outcomes. It has been translated into three languages. 

As the academic director for the Centre for Educational Leadership for eight years, Robinson was instrumental in the delivery of a New Zealand-wide induction programme for new school leaders. Robinson has consulted on leadership development and research to government agencies and organisations internationally, including in Sweden, Denmark, Norway, England, Singapore, Chile, Canada and Australia.

She retired in June 2018, having published five books, 88 peer-reviewed papers, and 37 book chapters. At the time of her retirement, her colleagues said "very few scholars globally would have had a greater impact on educational leadership scholarship, policy and practice than Viviane. She has shifted educational thinking, contributed enormously to school improvement, and, in so doing, changed lives and enhanced communities."

Honours and awards 
Robinson was appointed a Fellow of the American Educational Research Association in 2011, and was made an Officer of the New Zealand Order of Merit in 2014, for services to education. Robinson was awarded the Mason Durie medal in 2016, and was made a Fellow of the Royal Society Te Apārangi in 2017.  In 2017 Robinson was selected as one of the Royal Society Te Apārangi's 150 women in 150 words.

Selected works

References 

New Zealand women academics
Harvard University alumni
Academic staff of the University of Auckland
New Zealand women psychologists
Fellows of the Royal Society of New Zealand
Officers of the New Zealand Order of Merit
Year of birth missing (living people)
Living people